David T. D. Vondee (born 2 August 1978) is a Ghanaian politician who currently serves as the Member of Parliament for the Twifo-Atii Morkwaa Constituency in the Central Region of Ghana.

Early life and education 
David Vondee was born on 2 August 1978 and hails from Mafi Adidome in the Volta Region of Ghana. David Vondee had his Associate Degree in (Marketing, Administration and Communication) in 2020.

Career 
David Vondee is working as the Member of Parliament (MP) for Twifo-Atii Morkwaa Constituency in the Central Region of Ghana on the ticket of the National Democratic Congress.

Political life 
David Vondee contested and won the NDC parliamentary primaries for Twifo-Atii Morkwaa Constituency in the Central Region of Ghana.

2020 elections 
David Vondee won again in the 2020 Ghanaian general elections on the ticket of the National Democratic Congress with 21,416 votes making 51.5% of the total votes cast to join the Eighth (8th) Parliament of the Fourth Republic of Ghana against Ebenezer Obeng Dwamena of the New Patriotic Party who had 19,594 votes (47.2%) Samuel Kofi Essel of GUM who also had 541 votes (1.3%).

Committees 
David Vondee is a member of the Works and Housing Committee of the Eighth (8th) Parliament of the Fourth Republic of Ghana.

Personal life 
David Vondee is an Ewe and a Christian.

Accusations/Assaults 
David Vondee was being accused of a $2.4 million land fraud between August 2015 and July 2016 under the guise of selling a tract of land to a private company called "REI Ghana Limited" of which he pleaded not guilty in court. He was granted a bail of ₵2 million.

References 

Living people
1978 births
National Democratic Congress (Ghana) politicians
Ghanaian MPs 2021–2025
People from Central Region (Ghana)
https://gossips24.com/hon-david-vondeendc-mp-in-tears-of-joy-as-court-frees-him-on-charges-of-fraud-money-laundering/